Gigantine is an tetrahydroisoquinoline alkaloid found in Carnegiea gigantea and other related cacti. Gigantine was first discovered along with macromerine in 1967. It is found in significant quantities in many mescaline-containing cactus species, but it is unclear whether gigantine contributes in any way to their psychoactive effects.

References

Norsalsolinol ethers